Pnar may refer to:

 Pnar people, a tribe of Meghalaya state of India, also known as Jaintia or Synteng
 Pnar language, spoken by the Pnar people
 Passive neutron albedo reactivity, one of non-destructive assay techniques